The Y.W.C.A. Building is a -story building on 130 E. Kiowa Street in Colorado Springs, Colorado. Built in 1913, it was added to the National Register of Historic Places on September 10, 1979. Its estimated height is 66.85 ft.

References

Clubhouses on the National Register of Historic Places in Colorado
Colorado State Register of Historic Properties
Buildings and structures in Colorado Springs, Colorado
National Register of Historic Places in Colorado Springs, Colorado